Vanuza António Francisco (born 24 July 2002), simply known as Vanuza, is an Angolan footballer who plays as a defender for CD 1º de Agosto and the Angola women's national team.

Club career
Vanuza has played for 1º de Agosto in Angola.

International career
Vanuza was capped for Angola at senior level during a 0–1 friendly away loss to Namibia on 10 April 2021.

References

2002 births
Living people
Angolan women's footballers
Women's association football defenders
C.D. Primeiro de Agosto players
Angola women's international footballers